Georgios "George" A. Contas (August 25, 1890 – September 21, 1971) also known as George Knockout Brown was a Greek American middleweight boxer from Chicago, Illinois.

Biography 
He was born on August 25, 1890, in Sparta, Greece. His family moved to Chicago, Illinois. He traveled many times to Australia to fight.

After his boxing career, he was a Sergeant in the Cicero IL Police Department. George and his wife, Sally, had no children.

References 

Welterweight boxers
1890 births
Year of death missing
American male boxers
Greek male boxers
Greek emigrants to the United States
Boxers from Chicago
Sportspeople from Sparta, Peloponnese